Stauffer Bluff is a rocky bluff at the northeast extremity of Mount Takahe in Marie Byrd Land. Mapped by United States Geological Survey (USGS) from surveys and U.S. Navy tricamera aerial photos, 1959–66. Named by Advisory Committee on Antarctic Names (US-ACAN) for Bernhard Stauffer (University of Bern, Switzerland), United States Antarctic Research Program (USARP) glaciologist at Byrd Station, 1968–69 and 1969–70.

References 

Cliffs of Marie Byrd Land